Reginald Scotson (22 September 1919 – 1999) was an English professional footballer who played as a wing half.

References

1919 births
1999 deaths
Footballers from Stockton-on-Tees
Footballers from County Durham
English footballers
Association football wing halves
Sunderland A.F.C. players
Grimsby Town F.C. players
Skegness Town A.F.C. players
English Football League players